Filmoteca, temas de cine is an Argentine television program. Airing since 2006, it broadcasts and talks about the cinema of Argentina and world cinema, as well as Classic Hollywood films and cult films. It also covers a large amount of genres and film themes.

Awards

Nominations
 2015 Martín Fierro Awards: Best cultural program.

References

Televisión Pública original programming
Argentine educational television series